William Nathaniel Pennyfeather (born May 25, 1968) is a former professional baseball player. He played parts of three seasons in Major League Baseball as an center fielder for the Pittsburgh Pirates.

Professional career
Pennyfeather accepted a scholarship to play college football at Syracuse. After his sophomore football season at Syracuse, Pennyfeather signed with the Pittsburgh Pirates in 1988 after a personal tryout and began his professional career with the Pirates' affiliate in the Gulf Coast League.

During his major league career he appeared in 40 games over those three years and collected nine hits, including a double.

In 1994 he was claimed on waivers by the Cincinnati Reds, who traded him to the California Angels for Eduardo Pérez in 1996.

Pennyfeather continued to play professionally after the end of his major league career. He played for the minor league affiliates of the Anaheim Angels and Los Angeles Dodgers, as well as the Taipei Gida of the Taiwan Major League, the Broncos de Reynosa of the Mexican League, and teams in the independent Northern League and Atlantic League. He is one of only three players who played in the Atlantic League in each of its first ten seasons.

2006 was Pennyfeather's final season, during which he played for the Newark Bears of the Atlantic League. He went out on a high note, as he was honored as Newark Bears Player of the Year, and was also a member of the Atlantic League All-Star team. The Bears honored him with an in-game ceremony on September 21, 2006, during their final home game of the season.

Notes

External links 

The Baseball Gauge
Venezuela Winter League

1968 births
Living people
African-American baseball players
Albuquerque Dukes players
American expatriate baseball players in Canada
American expatriate baseball players in Mexico
American expatriate baseball players in Taiwan
Atlantic City Surf players
Augusta Pirates players
Baseball players from New Jersey
Bridgeport Bluefish players
Broncos de Reynosa players
Buffalo Bisons (minor league) players
Caribes de Anzoátegui players
Carolina Mudcats players
Edmonton Trappers players
Erie SeaWolves players
Gulf Coast Pirates players
Indianapolis Indians players
Leones del Caracas players
American expatriate baseball players in Venezuela
Major League Baseball center fielders
Newark Bears players
Pittsburgh Pirates players
Princeton Pirates players
Princeton Reds players
Salem Buccaneers players
Sioux Falls Canaries players
Somerset Patriots players
Sportspeople from Perth Amboy, New Jersey
Syracuse Orangemen baseball players
Syracuse University alumni
Taipei Gida players
Vancouver Canadians players
Welland Pirates players
21st-century African-American people
20th-century African-American sportspeople
Syracuse Orange football players
Perth Amboy High School alumni